Beinn Chaorach (713 m) is a hill in the southern foothills of the Grampian Mountains of Scotland. It lies in the Luss Hills of Argyll and Bute, between Loch Lomond and Loch Long.

The most southerly of the Luss Hills, this grassy peak is often climbed in conjunction with its neighbour Beinn a' Mhanaich, although  Ministry of Defence land lies to the west of the summit, so this side should be avoided.

References

Marilyns of Scotland
Grahams
Mountains and hills of Argyll and Bute